Pyrenaearia carascalensis is a species of small air-breathing land snail, a terrestrial pulmonate gastropod mollusk in the family Hygromiidae, the hairy snails and their allies. 

Subspecies
 Pyrenaearia carascalensis carascalensis (Michaud, 1831)
 Pyrenaearia carascalensis transfuga (Fagot, 1885)

Description
The size of the snail attains 13.2 mm.

Distribution
This species is endemic to Spain and is found in Carascal (Aragon).

References

 Férussac A.E.J.P.J.F. d’A , 1821 - Tableaux systématiques des animaux mollusques classés en familles naturelles, dans lesquels on a établi la concordance de tous les systèmes; suivis d'un prodrome générale pour tous les mollusques terrestres ou fluviatiles, vivants ou fossiles. Deuxième partie. (Première section.). Tableaux particuliers des mollusques terrestres et fluviatiles, présentant pour chaque famille les genres et espèces qui la composent. Classe des gastéropodes. Ordre des pulmonés sans opercules. II. Tableau systématique des Limaçons, Cochleae. III. Tableau systématique des pulmonés géhydrophiles. 114 p. [folio edition; January], 111 p. [quarto edition; June]
 Bank, R. A.; Neubert, E. (2017). Checklist of the land and freshwater Gastropoda of Europe. Last update: July 16th, 2017

External links
 Michaud, A.-L.-G. (1831). Complément de l'Histoire des mollusques terrestres et fluviatiles de la France, de J.P.R. Draparnaud. i-xvi, 1-116, Errata (1 p.), 1-12, pls 14-16

Pyrenaearia
Endemic fauna of Spain
Gastropods described in 1831